"The Parking Ticket" is the 12th television play episode of the first season of the Australian anthology television series Australian Playhouse. "The Parking Ticket" was written by Max Colwell and Michael Wright and directed by Henri Safran and originally aired on ABC on 4 July 1966.

Plot
Bob Rankin receives a parking ticket and discovers he lives in a world of aggressive inspectors. The father of a man who has seduced a young woman is given a ticket by the father of the girl.

Cast
 Stewart Ginn as the boys father
 Lynne Murphy as Muriel
 Shirley MacDonald as Vi
 Charles Little as the boy Denis
 Carmen Duncan 
 Willie Fennell as Steve

Reception
The Sydney Morning Herald said it provides "both humour and drama."

The Age called it "a gem".

References

External links
 
 The Parking Ticket at National Archives of Australia

1966 television plays
1966 Australian television episodes
1960s Australian television plays
Australian Playhouse (season 1) episodes
Black-and-white television episodes